Jaycee is a given name. Notable people with the name include:

Jaycee Carroll (born 1983), American-Azerbaijani basketball player
Jaycee Chan (born 1982), American-born Hong Kong actor and singer
Jaycee Dugard (born 1980), American kidnapping victim
Jaycee John Okwunwanne (born 1985), Nigerian footballer

See also
Jaycie, given name
JC (disambiguation), includes list of people whose name begin with the initials
Jayce, given name